L'Entente may refer to:

 Entente Bagneaux-Fontainebleau-Nemours, also known as l'Entente, a former football club
 L'Entente SSG, an active football club

See also 
 Entente (disambiguation)